Kadhalum Kadanthu Pogum is a 2016 Indian Tamil-language romantic comedy film written and directed by Nalan Kumarasamy in his second feature film after Soodhu Kavvum. Produced by C. V. Kumar under his Thirukumaran Entertainment banner, with K. E. Gnanavel Raja also co-producing the film under Studio Green, it stars Vijay Sethupathi and Madonna Sebastian, the latter in her Tamil film debut. It is an official remake of the 2010 Korean film My Dear Desperado.
 
The film focuses about a rowdy and an IT professional whom share a special bond when they live as neighbours. Nalan Kumarasamy initially developed the script as a dark comedy; however as several other films were being released in the same genre, he rewrote the entire script from scratch which spent him two years. The principal shooting of the film began in April 2015 and ended that July, with film being set mostly in Chennai.

The film's soundtrack and background score is composed by Santhosh Narayanan, with Dinesh B. Krishnan and Leo John Paul serving as the cinematographer and editor respectively. The film was released on 11 March 2016 to positive reviews from critics who mostly praised the performances of Sethupathi and Madonna along with the direction and technical aspects of the film,but the movie opened with less reception and became an above average success at the box office.

Plot
Villupuram-based engineering graduate Yazhini Bakthirajan, leaves for Chennai against her parents' wishes to pursue a career in the IT sector. When the company she works for shuts down suddenly five months later, she faces financial hardship and is forced to move into a low-cost housing colony while searching for a new job, where her neighbour Kathiravan resides.

Kathir is a rowdy who works for a local area councillor Thilagar, whose only aim in life is to own a bar of his own. He had just been released from prison after serving a five-year sentence for taking the blame for a crime he did not commit on the orders of the councillor. Kathir did the deed on the promise that his status within the councillor's gang will be elevated once he is released, but the promise was reneged. Though both of them dislike each other in the beginning, they gradually warm up to each other despite their different backgrounds and become a sort of symbiotic support system for one another.

Facing pressure from her family over her career and wedding, Yazhini introduces Kathir to her parents as her boyfriend who is a successful manager in an IT firm. Her parents decide to fix their marriage but change their mind after seeing Kathir thrashing two men opposite a temple, realising that he is a rowdy. They bar Yazhini from returning to Chennai, even forbidding her to attend an important job interview. Meanwhile, Kathir starts a gang war by beating up the henchmen of a rival gangster Moda Kumar. The councillor decides that Kathir should murder Kumar. After ensuring that Yazhini attends her interview, Kathir proceeds with the plan to murder Kumar. However, during the ensuing scuffle, Kathir ends up being stabbed with a rebar and is left to bleed to death.

Two years later, Yazhini has become a director in her company and has moved out of the housing colony. She constantly thinks about Kathir, whom she had never seen again after her interview. Yazhini yearns to show Kathir her new life, knowing that he is the one person who will be happier than even herself in her having achieved her dreams. She soon finds Kathir working at a petrol bunk, having survived his murder attempt and abandoned his rowdy past. The two rejoice in the happy ending.

Cast

 Vijay Sethupathi as Kathiravan
 Madonna Sebastian as Yazhini Bakthirajan 
 Samuthirakani as Moda Kumar
 G. M. Sundar as Thilagar
 K. S. G. Venkatesh as Bakthirajan, Yazhini's father
 D. R. K. Kiran as Sampath, Kathir's friend
 Rindhu Ravi as Yazhini's mother
 Manikandan as Murali
 Sameer Bharat Ram
 Kailash
 Supergood Subramani
 Anushka
 Ramesh Thilak as Cab Driver (cameo appearance)

Production

Development 
After his debut film Soodhu Kavvum received critical and commercial accolades, Nalan Kumarasamy started penning the script for his second film under the title Eskimo Kadhal, which is touted to be an "out-and-out romantic one", with C. V. Kumar who earlier produced Nalan's Soodhu Kavvum had bankrolled this film. As the script demanded a prominent actor to play the male lead role, he narrated the script first to Suriya whom he gave nod to the project, after Suriya's interest in working with young filmmakers. But he could not allot the dates due to his commitments with Lingusamy's Anjaan. Further negotiations with Gautham Karthik became unsuccessful, which resulted Nalan to put the project on held and started working on another film titled Kai Neelam, a sequel to Soodhu Kavvum and also the second film in the Trilogy of Trick, which Nalan had curated.

In a turn of events, Nalan shelved the project and began working on a remake of the Korean film My Dear Desperado for the same producers, irrespective of the film being remade in Hindi as Jayantabhai Ki Luv Story. Kumar paid  to acquire the Korean film's remake rights. In April 2015, Vijay Sethupathi was confirmed to play the leading role in the film in his second collaboration with Kumarasamy after Soodhu Kavvum. The project had a formal launch on the same month, with the technical team of Soodhu Kavvum comprising music director Santhosh Narayanan, cinematographer Dinesh Krishnan and editor Leo John Paul being a part of the film and K. E. Gnanavel Raja of Studio Green was the co-producer.

Nalan Kumarasamy initially wrote the script of this film (along with Kai Neelam) as a black comedy due to the success of Soodhu Kavvum. However, within the completion of the first draft, many films based on black comedy released during the intermediate timeline. Nalan who does not want to repeat genres had shelved the project Kai Neelam, as well as rewriting the script from the stratch owing to the long gap between his first and second film. He also noted that the film will have unique pattern as similar to Soodhu Kavvum and also there will be comic elements with stress on relationships.

Casting 
Initially the team approached Trisha to play the female lead, but the actress denied her presence in the film. After multiple auditions for the female lead, Kumarasamy roped in Madonna Sebastian to play the role after she shot to fame with Premam. She revealed that Vishnu Govind and Sree Sankar (the sound designer duo who worked in Premam), who also became a part of Kumarasamy's project mentioned the name to the director, and she got to play the female lead during an audition. She further added that her role is an out-of-comfort zone and expressive character, saying "I play a middle class girl looking for a job in the city and she meets the hero, played by Sethupathi, from the city, and the story goes on. I can’t reveal much about the film. But it will be a breezy entertainer." Madonna further added despite Premam becoming successful among the Tamil audience, she was not familiar with Tamil, so she took time to memorise the dialogues and perform on the set. Further stating "Initially I found speaking in Tamil a bit difficult. But now I am learning the language so that I can easily get enact my role".

Filming 
Principal photography for the film began in April 2015, with the first schedule being shot in Chennai for 20 days. As of May 2015, the team had wrapped 50% of the shoot within 25 days while most of the film is set in Chennai. The principal shooting of the film completed during July 2015, and post-production process began soon after its completion. While the film was developed under the title Eskimo Kadhal, in September 2015, the makers announced the film's title as Kadhalum Kadanthu Pogum.

Soundtrack 

The film's five-song soundtrack and background score were composed by Santhosh Narayanan in his second collaboration with Nalan Kumarasamy after Soodhu Kavvum. Lyrics for the songs were written by Thamarai, Mohan Rajan, Vivek, Arunraja Kamaraj and Kumarasamy himself. One of the songs from the film titled "Ka Ka Ka Po" which was inspired from the 2006 film Imsai Arasan 23rd Pulikecei. It was released as the lead single from the soundtrack on 8 February 2016 at a launch event held in Sathyam Cinemas in Chennai, and became an instant hit upon release. The album released on 22 February 2016 by Sony Music India which acquired the music rights.

Behindwoods gave the soundtrack three stars out of five, it summarised "Santhosh Narayanan strikes again with his unique ideas of fusion music!" Giving three out of five, Siddharth Srinivas of Sify called the soundtrack as "slightly inferior", but added that the album featured superior audio aura and quality, which make up for the familiarity in tunes further adding that "there is work to be done with the visuals". Karthik Srinivasan of Milliblog stated the album as "passable soundtrack" and stated the songs "Paravai Parandhuchu" and "Bongu Kichan" are likeable.

Release 
The film's first look and teaser was released with an acronym Ka Ka Ka Po being used as part of the promotions. In late January 2016, debutant filmmaker P. S. Vijay sued the makers as they found the title too similar comparing with his film Ka Ka Ka Po, although the former had a different expansion. Vijay also stated that this may not only create misperception among the audience but also affects the business prospects of the films.

The film was initially scheduled for a theatrical release on 12 February 2016, coinciding with the Valentine's Day weekend. However, due to post-production delays and as Vijay Sethupathi's another film Sethupathi being released on the same month of February, the makers pushed the release to 11 March 2016, as trade analysts believed that the prospects of both the films will be affected if being released on the same month. It received U certificate from the Censor Board which further became eligible for the exemption of the entertainment tax levied by the Tamil Nadu state government. The film opened in more than 300 screens across Tamil Nadu, and due to positive response the number of screens had been increased on 14 March.

Reception

Critical response 
The film opened to positive response from critics. M. Suganth, editor-in-chief of The Times of India gave three-and-a-half out off five stars saying "The stylish nonchalance of Vijay Sethupathi and the earnestness of Madonna Sebastian complement each perfectly that we root for these characters to succeed". Behindwoods gave three stars for the film and wrote "Kadhalum Kadandhu Pogum is a whole new experience. At the minimum, it might just excite you or even go to the extent of making you jump out of joy". Praising the performances of Vijay Sethupathi and Madonna Sebastian, with the writing, Sify reviewed the film as a "classy rom-com" giving three out of five stars for the film.

Gauthaman Bhaskaran gave three stars in his review for Hindustan Times saying "though the film is often predictable and ponderous, there are some interesting shots that lift the narrative". In his review for India Today, Kirubhakar Purushothaman gave three-and-a-half out of five stars and praised the performances of the actors along with the writing and filmmaking. S. Saraswathi of Rediff gave three out of five stars saying "The best part is that, though the film revolves around Kathir and Yazhini, they are just small players in the larger story. With riveting performances by the lead actors, a delightful script and the magic wielded by of director Nalan Kumarasamy and composer Santhosh Narayanan, the film is a sure winner".

Noted film critic Baradwaj Rangan in his review for The Hindu, praised Nalan Kumarasamy for "breaking the stereotypes of romance genre films in Tamil", saying that "Nalan isn't just reshaping the Kollywood romance here [...] He’s also reshaping the hero himself". He further reviewed that "the Kathir-Yazhini scenes accrue weight towards the closing portions, so much so that we find ourselves completing their stories in our heads during the drive home." Moviecrow gave a positive review saying "With a brilliant performance from Vijay Sethupathi, Kadhalum Kadanthu Pogum is treat of a different kind from the team of Soodhu Kavvum".

Box office
In its opening weekend, the film collected  in Tamil Nadu from 327 screens, and  crore from 264 shows in Chennai. Overall, it was the highest opening in Vijay Sethupathi's career.

The film released in more than 47 theatres in North America and grossed $41,000 on its first day. In Australia, it earned  and in Malaysia, .

References

External links
 

2016 films
2010s Tamil-language films
2016 romantic comedy-drama films
Indian romantic comedy-drama films
Indian remakes of South Korean films
2016 comedy films
2016 drama films